Maha Ali (Arabic:  مها علي ; born 17 May 1973) is a Jordanian politician and industrial engineer who served as Minister of Industry, Trade and Supply of Jordan from October 2020 to October 2021, in the Cabinet of Prime Minister Bisher Al-Khasawneh.

Prior to her recent appointment, Ali previously also served as Minister of Industry, Trade and Supply in 2015-2016, assuming the position after a cabinet reshuffle in Prime Minister Abdullah Ensour's government on 2 March 2015.

Early life and education
Maha Ali was born in Amman in 1973. Her father is a Jordanian medical doctor and retired general in the Jordanian Armed Forces. She is trilingual in Arabic, English and French.

Ali has a B.Sc. in industrial engineering from the University of Jordan, a trade policy diploma from the WTO in Switzerland and an MBA from the German Jordanian University. 

According to Durham University, Ali is pursuing a PhD in Business from the university's business school, with research interests in "Institutions and Outward FDIs from the MENA Region".

Political career
Ali began her public service career in 1998. From August 1998 until February 2001, she was a researcher at the World Trade Organization. Ali was then assigned as the Head of Trade in the Services Section of the Foreign Trade Policy Department until April 2002. Between April 2002 and April 2003, she was assigned as a deputy economic counsellor at Jordan's permanent mission to the United Nations. In October 2003 she assumed the role of the director of the Foreign Trade Policy Department until 2010, when she became Secretary-General (deputy minister) of the ministry.

During her incumbency as Secretary-General, she led negotiations on Jordan's accession to the WTO and was the head of the Jordanian delegation on the country's adherence to the OECD. Ali also hosted the investments and trade pillar of the Deauville Partnership meeting in 2012 and has played a key role during joint committee meetings with Jordan's trade partners. She additionally led work on Jordan's historic free trade agreements with the US, Singapore, Canada and Turkey.Ali was a board member of a number of government institutions including Jordan Enterprise Development Corporation, Jordan Investment Board, and Jordan Development Zones Company prior to her being appointed minister.

On 2 March 2015, a cabinet reshuffle in the Second Cabinet of Abdullah Ensour saw Ali appointed as Minister of Industry, Trade and Supply. Abdullah Ensour's government resigned on 1 June 2016. 

On 12 October 2020, a Royal Decree was issued, approving the formation of a new Cabinet, headed by Bisher Al-Khasawneh. In addition, alongside other Cabinet members, the Decree approved the appointment of Ali as Minister of Industry, Trade and Supply.

Educational career 
Ali worked as an industrial professor at the School of Management and Logistical Sciences at the German Jordanian University. Additionally, she was a professor of practice at the Al Hussein Technical University (HTU). 

Her research interests include international trade and international business.

Honours and awards
Ali was ranked as the 8th Most Powerful Arab Woman in Government by Forbes in 2015 and has been awarded several royal medals by Jordan's King Abdullah II for her efficiency in civil service, including the Order of Independence of the third class.

In 2016, she received the Governor General’s Medallion by the Governor General of Canada David Johnston, for efforts exerted in strengthening trade between Jordan and Canada.

See also
 Second cabinet of Abdullah Ensour
 Bisher Al-Khasawneh's Cabinet

References

External links 

 Ministry of Industry, Trade and Supply

1973 births
Government ministers of Jordan
Jordanian engineers
Living people
University of Jordan alumni
21st-century Jordanian women politicians
21st-century Jordanian politicians
Women government ministers of Jordan
Industry ministers of Jordan
Trade ministers of Jordan